Agency is a 2023 South Korean television series starring Lee Bo-young, Son Na-eun, Jo Sung-ha, and Han Joon-woo. It aired from January 7 to February 26, 2023, on JTBC's Saturdays and Sundays at 22:30 (KST) time slot.

The series was a commercial hit and became one of the highest-rated dramas in Korean cable television history.

Synopsis
The series follows the story of Go Ah-in (Lee Bo-young) who becomes the first female executive member of a large advertising agency.

Cast

Main
 Lee Bo-young as Go Ah-in: a creative director who leads Production Team 2 of VC Planning, a leading advertising agency. She has a strong desire for success despite growing up in poverty.
 Son Na-eun as Kang Han-na: VC Group's third generation chaebol.
 Jo Sung-ha as Choi Chang-su: the director of the planning division of VC Planning who strives to become CEO.
 Han Joon-woo as Park Young-woo: Han-na's loyal right-hand man.

Supporting

People at VC Planning
 Jeon Hye-jin as Jo Eun-jung: copywriter of VC Planning's Production Team 2.
 Lee Chang-hoon as Han Byung-soo: art director of VC Planning's Production Team 2.
 Lee Kyung-min as Seo Jang-woo: assistant manager of VC Planning's Production Team 2.
 Kim Dae-gon as Kwon Woo-cheol: creative director of VC Planning's Production Team 1.
 Jung Woon-sun as Bae Won-hee: copywriter of VC Planning's Production Team 1.
 Park Ji-il as Jo Moon-ho: CEO of VC Planning.
 Baek Soo-hee as Jung Su-jeong: Ah-in's secretary.

People around Ah-in
 Kim Mi-kyung as Seo Eun-ja: Ah-in's mother.
 Jang Hyun-sung as Yoo Jung-seok: Ah-in's mentor.
 Shin Soo-jung as Oh Soo-jin: Ah-in's friend who is a psychiatrist.
 Lee Ki-woo as Jung Jae-hoon: CEO of a game company.
 Kim Soo-jin as Choi Jung-min: CEO of an independent agency.

People at VC Group
 Jeon Gook-hwan as Kang Geun-cheol: founder of VC Group.
 Song Young-chang as Kang Yong-ho: chairman of VC Group.
 Jo Bok-rae as Kang Han-soo: vice president of VC Group Headquarters.
 Jung Seung-gil as Kim Tae-wan: VC Group Headquarters' chief secretary.
 Kim Min-sang as Bae Jung-hyeon: VC Group Headquarters' legal team leader.

Others
 Jung Won-joong as Kim Woo-won: chairman of Woowon Group.
 Jung Ye-bin as Kim Seo-jung: Woo-won's only daughter who is the vice president of Woowon Group.
 Kim Ra-on as Song Ah-ji: Eun-jung's son.
 Jo Eun-sol as Song Jung-ho: Eun-jung's husband.
 Yoon Bok-in as Park Kyung-sook: Eun-jung's mother-in-law.

Extended
 Kim Chae-eun as Yoo Ji-woo: Jung-seok's daughter.
 Lee Dong-ha

Special appearance
 Song Young-kyu as Hwang Seok-woo

Viewership

References

External links
  
 
 

Korean-language television shows
JTBC television dramas
Television series by JTBC Studios
South Korean workplace television series
2023 South Korean television series debuts
2023 South Korean television series endings